The Bass Island Brownstone Company Quarry, also known as the Basswood Island Quarry, on Basswood Island in Lake Superior was operational from 1868 to 1893. The brownstone was first used for construction of the second Milwaukee County Courthouse, now demolished. Blocks of sandstone remain, together with the rusting remains of quarrying machinery. All company buildings and workers' cabins have disappeared.

Other buildings built with the quarry's product include the old Chicago Tribune building, the Landmark Chapel at the Forest Home Cemetery and St. Paul's Episcopal Church, both in Milwaukee. The island and quarry are presently included in Apostle Islands National Lakeshore and are administered by the National Park Service. The quarry was placed on the National Register of Historic Places on March 29, 1978.

References

Buildings and structures in Ashland County, Wisconsin
Quarries in the United States
National Register of Historic Places in Apostle Islands National Lakeshore
Industrial buildings and structures on the National Register of Historic Places in Wisconsin
National Register of Historic Places in Ashland County, Wisconsin
1868 establishments in Wisconsin
1893 disestablishments in Wisconsin